Valborg Christensen (12 January 1917 – 14 June 2003) was a Danish swimmer. She competed in the women's 200 metre breaststroke at the 1936 Summer Olympics.

References

External links
 

1917 births
2003 deaths
Danish female breaststroke swimmers
Olympic swimmers of Denmark
Swimmers at the 1936 Summer Olympics
Swimmers from Copenhagen
Danish expatriates in Canada